Ilya Sergeyevich Gaponov (born 25 October 1997) is a Russian football player. He plays as a centre-back for Krylia Sovetov Samara.

Club career
He made his debut in the Russian Professional Football League for FC Strogino Moscow on 20 July 2015 in a game against FSK Dolgoprudny.

He made his Russian Premier League debut for FC Spartak Moscow on 25 April 2019 in a game against FC Arsenal Tula, as a starter.

On 22 February 2022, Gaponov joined Krylia Sovetov Samara on loan. On 30 May 2022, Gaponov moved to Krylia Sovetov on a permanent basis and signed a three-year contract.

Career statistics

References

External links
 
 

1997 births
Sportspeople from Oryol
Living people
Russian footballers
Russia under-21 international footballers
Association football defenders
FC Strogino Moscow players
FC Spartak-2 Moscow players
FC Spartak Moscow players
PFC Krylia Sovetov Samara players
Russian Premier League players
Russian First League players
Russian Second League players